Sergey Vladimirovich Polyakov (Russian: Сергей Владимирович Поляков, born May 3, 1951 in Kharkiv, Ukrainian SSR, Soviet Union) is a Russian-American scientist performing research for USPolyResearch. Developed an integrated approach to the design of air revitalization and water reclamation/conditioning system from human wastes on the basis of energy-efficient membrane and depth-filtration methods (membrane evaporation, ultra/micro filtration, reverse osmosis).

Biography
Sergey Polyakov received MS in engineering physics from the Kharkiv Polytechnical Institute (1974), PhD in space technology from the Institute for Biomedical Problems (Moscow, 1982). His major job track record includes the leading engineer and research consultant in the LSS department of the Institute for Biomedical Problems (1978 to 1985, 1992 to 1997); head of laboratory at the All-Union Electrotechnical Institute, Moscow (1985 to 1987), senior researcher at the All-Russian Nuclear Power Engineering Research and Development Institute, Moscow (1987 to 1992), and researcher at USPolyResearch, USA (2002 to present).

Major scientific achievements
Sergey Polyakov developed theoretical principles for designing an energy-efficient closed loop system of water reclamation from human wastes for a space flight to Mars, which is based on the combination of membrane and conventional filtration methods, including depth filtration and adsorption. The system prototype was successfully tested in long-term ground-based experiments. Sergey Polyakov also developed a set of original approximate methods for calculating the mass transfer and hydrodynamic characteristics of membrane systems in membrane evaporation, reverse osmosis, and ultra/microfiltration.

References

External links 
 All-Union Electrotechnical Institute website
 Article about the Institute for Biomedical Problems - on the site of the Moscow State University
 Institute for Biomedical Problems website
 Mars simulation experiment at the Institute for Biomedical Problems
 USPolyResearch website
  - documentary about the Martian simulator at the Institute for Biomedical Problems

1951 births
Living people
Russian chemists
Kharkiv Polytechnic Institute alumni
American chemical engineers
Scientists from Kharkiv